Leopold Ludwig (12 January 1908 – 25 April 1979) was a German conductor active mainly in Austria and Germany from the 1930s through the 1970s. He was principal conductor of the Oldenburgisches Staatstheater (1936–1939), Vienna State Opera (1939–1943), and Berlin Städtische Oper (1943–1946). From 1950–1971 he the general music director of the Hamburg State Opera; a position which brought him international recognition. He was a frequent guest conductor at the San Francisco Opera from 1958 through 1969, and also made guest appearances with the Metropolitan Opera in the early 1970s.

Life and career
Born in Witkowitz, Moravia, Leopold Ludwig was trained as a pianist at the Vienna Conservatory where he was a pupil of Emil Paur. He began his conducting career in the 1930s in south Germany and at Brno. In 1936 he became music director of the Oldenburgisches Staatstheater and concurrently was a frequent guest conductor at the Berlin State Opera. In 1939 he became the principal conductor at the Vienna State Opera; a post he held until 1943 when he became principal conductor of the Berlin Städtische Oper.

After World War II, Ludwig was active as a conductor at both the Berlin State Oper and the Berlin Städtische Oper. In 1950 he became general music director of the Hamburg State Opera (HSO), a position he held for the next 21 years. This position brought him international recognition, and he played an instrumental role in placing the Hamburg State Opera as one of the leading opera houses on the international stage by programming innovative repertoire and touring internationally with several lauded productions. The first of these was at the Edinburgh Festival in 1952 when the HSO presented the British première of Hindemith's Mathis der Maler. In 1960 he conducted the world premiere of Hans Werner Henze's Der Prinz von Homburg and in 1965 he conducted the world premiere of Giselher Klebe's Jacobowsky und der Oberst; both at the HSO.

From 1958 through 1969 Ludwig was a frequent guest conductor at the San Francisco Opera (SFO); beginning his appearances in San Francisco with a double bill performance of the United States premieres of Carl Orff's Carmina Burana and Orff's Die Kluge on October 3, 1958. He later conducted the world premiere of Norman Dello Joio's Blood Moon at the SFO on September 18, 1961, and the United States premiere of Dmitri Shostakovich's Katerina Ismailova on October 23, 1964. Other works he conducted for the SFO included Elektra (1958), Tannhäuser (1958), The Bartered Bride (1958, 1964),Ariadne auf Naxos (1959), Die Frau ohne Schatten (1959-1960, 1964), Die Meistersinger von Nürnberg (1959, 1961, 1965), Don Giovanni (1959, 1962), Simon Boccanegra (1960), Wozzeck (1960, 1962), Boris Godunov (1961), Fidelio (1961), The Rake's Progress (1962), Dialogues of the Carmelites (1963), Die Walküre (1963, 1968–1969), The Queen of Spades (1963), Die Fledermaus (1965), Lulu (1965), and Das Rheingold (1968).

Ludwig also worked internationally with other opera houses as a guest conductor. In 1959 he conducted Der Rosenkavalier at the Glyndebourne Festival. He continued to conduct at the Met in 1971–1972 with Parsifal and Der Freischütz.

Leopold Ludwig died on April 24, 1979 in Lüneburg. In 1958 he was awarded the Johannes Brahms Medal.

References

Further reading 
 Leopold Ludwig. In Die Zeit, Nr. 20/1956
 Leopold Ludwig on Munzinger

External links 
 Recordings, JPC.de
 

1908 births
1979 deaths
German male conductors (music)
German opera directors
Moravian-German people
Musicians from Ostrava
Nazi Party members